Thierry Marien (born 2 October 1992) is a Belgian basketball player for Horticult Kontich Wolves and the Belgian 3x3 national team.

He represented Belgium at the 2020 Summer Olympics.

References

External links
 
 
 
 

1992 births
Living people
3x3 basketball players at the 2020 Summer Olympics
Belgian men's basketball players
Belgian men's 3x3 basketball players
Forwards (basketball)
Olympic 3x3 basketball players of Belgium
Sportspeople from Antwerp